Jason Riley (born October 4, 1958 in Scarborough, Ontario) is a former professional Canadian football offensive lineman.

Riley played college football at the University of British Columbia. Riley played eleven seasons in the Canadian Football League for three different teams. He was named CFL All-Star in 1989, and was a part of a Grey Cup championship team with the Hamilton Tiger-Cats in 1986. He also won the award for the Ticats Most Outstanding linesman in 1989 and 1992. He retired from the CFL in 1993.

After his retirement Riley taught at Notre Dame High School in Burlington, Ontario. Riley has coached offensive line at McMaster University for 18 yrs.  Riley is married and has 3 children. Riley was named Master Instructor of Offensive Line for Ontario by the Ontario Football Alliance in 2010.

References 

1958 births
Living people
Canadian football offensive linemen
Hamilton Tiger-Cats players
Players of Canadian football from Ontario
Saskatchewan Roughriders players
Sportspeople from Scarborough, Toronto
Canadian football people from Toronto
UBC Thunderbirds football players
University of British Columbia alumni
Winnipeg Blue Bombers players